HMS Goliath was an 80-gun two-deck second rate ship of the line of the Royal Navy, launched on 25 July 1842 at Chatham Dockyard.

Goliath was fitted with screw propulsion in 1857. In 1870, she was converted into a pauper training ship for workhouse boys. Goliath was destroyed by fire on 22 December 1875 while at anchor in the River Thames near Grays. Of the approximately 500 on board, 23 boys were killed.

Notes

References

Lavery, Brian (2003) The Ship of the Line - Volume 1: The development of the battlefleet 1650-1850. Conway Maritime Press. .

Ships of the line of the Royal Navy
Vanguard-class ships of the line
Ships built in Chatham
1842 ships
Maritime incidents in December 1875